Lord Gascoyne-Cecil may refer to:

 Lord Edward Gascoyne-Cecil (1867–1918), British soldier and colonial administrator in Egypt
 Lord Robert Gascoyne-Cecil (born 1946), Conservative politician
 Lord William Gascoyne-Cecil (1863–1936), Bishop of Exeter

See also

 Gascoyne-Cecil
 Lord Cecil (disambiguation)